Alcay (possibly from Quechua for to cut halfway through, to interrupt; to fail,) or Alcoy ( means "my dog") is a  mountain in the Andes of Peru. It is located in the Junín Region, Yauli Province, Carhuacayan District and in the Lima Region, Huaral Province, Atavillos Alto District. It lies southwest of Yanque.

References

Mountains of Peru
Mountains of Junín Region
Mountains of Lima Region